Edenderry Power Station is a large peat and biomass-fired power station at the Cushaling river near Edenderry, in the Republic of Ireland. It was purchased from E.ON in December 2005. Trials of co-fuelling the plant with biomass commenced in 2007 and were successful. , the plant is co-fired with about 62% biomass (delivered by around 60 heavy goods vehicles per day), of which 336,000 energy tonnes (or 80%) is Irish. The station has a target of 100% biomass by 2023. The ash is sent by rail and deposited at the adjacent Cloncreen bog near Clonbullogue. In 2021 the plant was still burning peat from stocks but was not allowed to cut more.

Bord Na Mona has announced plans to increase its intake of biomass to 1 Million tonnes at its Edenderry power station. The station is set to fully phase out the use of peat in 2023 and will instead increase its use of forestry residues and sustainable biomass by 400,000t to produce electricity. The announcement was made by head of renewable energy at Bord Na Mona Dr John Reilly on 11th October 2022.

See also 

 List of largest power stations in the world
 List of power stations in the Republic of Ireland

References

External links 
www.bnm.ie 
www.edenderrypower.ie 

Peat-fired power stations in the Republic of Ireland